Dominique Sigaud (born 28 January 1959 in Paris) is a French journalist, essayist and novelist.

Biography 
From 1984 to 1996, as an independent journalist, she traveled the Arab world and Africa.

In 1996, she was awarded the  prize for her article "Tutsis and Hutus: they are rebuilding together Rwanda in ruins", published in the magazine Cosmopolitan in November 1995. Since then she has devoted herself to writing.

Works 
1991:  
1996:  (Prix Gironde du premier roman 2007) prix Alain-Fournier 1997, prix Emmanuel Roblès 1997, prix Marguerite Yourcenar 1997
1997: 
1998: 
1999: 
2000: 
2001:  
2002: , Photos and paintings by Tony Soulié
2002: 
2004: 
2005: 
2006: 
2008: 
2011: 
2011: 
2012: 
2014: 
2015:

References

External links 
 Dominique Sigaud, écrivaine, Au-dessus des volcans on périphéries.net
 Dominique Sigaud on Babelio
 Duras n’a pas cent ans, Dominique Sigaud l’a rencontrée on Mediapart (30 January 2017)
 Dominique Sigaud on MEL

1959 births
Writers from Paris
Living people
French crime fiction writers
20th-century French journalists
21st-century French journalists
20th-century French essayists
21st-century French essayists
20th-century French novelists
21st-century French novelists
French women novelists
Prix Emmanuel Roblès recipients
Prix Alain-Fournier winners
21st-century French women writers
20th-century French women writers